Following is a list of municipal presidents of Tequila, in the Mexican state of Jalisco.

References

Tequila, Jalisco
Tequila, Jalisco
Politicians from Jalisco